We Steal Things. is the third EP of a three EP collection that was available for a limited time from the singer/songwriter Jason Mraz that was released as part of a pre-order bundle through iTunes, JasonMraz.com and AtlanticRecords.com on the release of his third studio album, We Sing. We Dance. We Steal Things.. Physical copies of this EP are very rare, and were released on handwritten CD-Rs. It was mainly released for those who pre-ordered We Sing, We Dance, We Steal Things from JasonMraz.com. The third EP was only released along with the new studio album on May 13, 2008. The EP is also included on the limited edition version of We Sing. We Dance. We Steal Things. which was released on November 18, 2008.

Track listing

References

2008 EPs
Jason Mraz EPs